Fundamental Destiny is a live album by the Art Ensemble of Chicago and Don Pullen recorded in June 1991 in Frankfurt, Germany and released in 2007 on the group's AECO label. It features performances by Lester Bowie, Joseph Jarman, Roscoe Mitchell, Malachi Favors Maghostut, and Don Moye with Don Pullen joining on piano.

Reception
The Allmusic review by Scott Yanow states that "This live recording, while not flawless, has enough bright moments to make it easily recommended to Art Ensemble collectors".

Track listing
 "People in Sorrow" (Bowie, Favors, Jarman, Mitchell) - 19:47
 "Song For Atala" (Mitchell) - 16:48
 "Fundamental Destiny" (Jarman) - 11:56
 "Odwalla/The Theme" (Mitchell) - 3:35 
Recorded live at Frankfurt Jazz Festival, Germany on June 1, 1991

Personnel
Lester Bowie: trumpet, percussion
Malachi Favors Maghostut: bass, percussion 
Roscoe Mitchell: soprano saxophone, alto saxophone, tenor saxophone, baritone saxophone, clarinet, flute, percussion 
Joseph Jarman: soprano saxophone, alto saxophone, tenor saxophone, synthesizer, clarinet, flute, percussion 
Famoudou Don Moye: drums, percussion 
Don Pullen: piano

References

Don Pullen albums
Art Ensemble of Chicago live albums
2007 live albums
AECO Records live albums